Turalei,  is a big Town in Twic  and HeadQuarter of Twic County , Warrap State, South Sudan, It has four suburbs: Pan Cuei, Pan Yai, Pan Noot, and Kauc Agok and other villages: Langic Aguek jokngar, Majok Kuel, Majok Amuol, Nyiel-Abiel, Majak-Aher, Pandit, Ayen, Marol, Riau Manyin, Anyiel Kuac, Mangok-Amiol, Achol, Wunkur, Makuac, Pan-Laj and War-Rual.

Location
Turalei is in Warrap State. It is the gubernatorial headquarters of Twic County. Its location is in Turalei Payam in the north of South Sudan near the border with the Republic of Sudan and the Abyei Region.

Overview
Bol's remains were buried in Turalei.

Due to its proximity to the border with Sudan, Turalei suffered extensive destruction during the second Sudanese Civil War of 1983 to 2005. Efforts are underway to assist in the rehabilitation of the settlement. Manute Bol was involved in some of those efforts. As a result, a hospital was built in the area.

In 2011, as hostilities flared up in neighbouring Abyei, Turalei has received an influx of refugees, who overwhelmed local resources. In June 2011, Turalei itself was attacked by militiamen believed to be affiliated with the Khartoum government. Several fatalities were recorded.

Population
The population of Turalei is not known but estimations are around one hundred thousands. Its population was gathered from the previous bomas which form Turalei payams. These bomas include Ayen-Amuol, Anyiel-Kuac, Nyiel-Abiel, Pandit-Amuol, Mangok-Amuol, Majak-Aher and Kac-Beek payams.

See also
 Gogrial
 Aweil
 Abyei
 Mayom

References

External links
 Turalei is very near Abyei
South Sudan's Administrative Divisions

Photos
 Photo of Turalei
 Satellite Map of Turalei
 Photos Taken In Turalei At Flickr.com

Populated places in Warrap (state)
Bahr el Ghazal